Events from the year 1991 in France.

Incumbents
 President: François Mitterrand 
 Prime Minister: Michel Rocard (until 15 May), Édith Cresson (starting 15 May)

Events
16 March – Official launch of the Citroen ZX. It partly replaces the larger BX, which will be completely replaced within the next two years by a larger model.
15 May – Édith Cresson becomes France's first female premier.
29 May – Olympique Marseille lose the European Cup final to Yugoslav champions Red Star Belgrade on penalties after a 0–0 draw in Bari, Italy.
5 September – Peugeot launches the all-new 106 supermini, designed as a marginally smaller alternative to the eight-year-old 205, which is expected to be phased out after the launch of a larger Peugeot which will replace the 309 in early 1993.
Pommeau is granted its Appellation d'origine contrôlée.

Arts and literature

Sport
6 July – Tour de France begins.
7 July – French Grand Prix is won by Nigel Mansell of the United Kingdom.
28 July – Tour de France ends, won by Miguel Indurain of Spain.

Births
3 January – Sébastien Faure, footballer
9 February – Alexandre Briancon, figure skater
10 February – Romain Wattel, golfer
28 May
Jonathan Ligali, soccer player
Alexandre Lacazette, soccer player
1 July – Kev Adams, comedian, actor, humorist, screenwriter and film producer
6 July – Victoirre Thivisol, actress.
16 July – Valentin Lavillenie, pole vaulter.
7 August – Lénora Guion-Firmin, sprinter
30 August – Gaia Weiss, model and actress.

Deaths

January to March
7 January – Henri Louveau, motor racing driver (born 1910).
24 February – Georges Capdeville, soccer referee (born 1899).
2 March – Serge Gainsbourg, poet, singer-songwriter, actor and director (born 1928).
12 March – Étienne Decroux, actor and mime (born 1898).
25 March – Marcel Lefebvre, Roman Catholic archbishop (born 1905).
29 March – Guy Bourdin, photographer (born 1928).
30 March – Silvia Monfort, actress and theatre director (born 1923).

April to June
3 April – Robert Veyron-Lacroix, harpsichordist and pianist (born 1922).
6 April – Louis Joxe, statesman and Minister (born 1901).
26 April – Leo Arnaud, composer of film scores (born 1904).
30 April – André Badonnel, entomologist (born 1898).
30 April – Ghislaine Marie Françoise Dommanget, actress and Princess of Monaco (born 1900).
8 May – Jean Langlais, composer and organist (born 1907).
20 May – Michel Gauquelin, psychologist and statistician (born 1928).
7 June – Antoine Blondin, writer (born 1922).
10 June – Jean Bruller, writer and illustrator (born 1902).
28 June – Jacques Corrèze, businessman and politician (born 1912).
29 June – Henri Lefebvre, sociologist and philosopher (born 1901).

July to September
27 July – Pierre Brunet, figure skater (born 1902).
29 July – Christian de Castries, military officer (born 1902).
5 August – Gaston Litaize, organist and composer (born 1909).
28 August – Pierre Guillaumat, politician and Minister (born 1909).
4 September – Henri de Lubac, Jesuit priest and theologian (born 1896).
5 September – Raymond Dronne, politician (born 1908).
17 September – Zino Francescatti, violinist (born 1902).
28 September – Eugène Bozza, composer (born 1905).

October to December
9 November – Yves Montand, actor and singer (born 1921).
15 November – Jacques Morali, music producer (born 1947).
18 November – Claude Cahen, orientalist (born 1909).
26 November – François Billetdoux, playwright and novelist (born 1927).
9 December – Gisèle Lestrange, graphic artist (born 1927).
13 December – André Pieyre de Mandiargues, writer (born 1909).
20 December – Gaston Waringhien, linguist, lexicographer and Esperantist (born 1901).
27 December – Hervé Guibert, writer (born 1955).

Full date unknown
Antoine Berman, translator and historian (born 1942).
Louis Henry, historian (born 1911).

See also
 List of French films of 1991

References

1990s in France